This is a list of members of the Tasmanian House of Assembly, elected at the 1998 state election:

 Liberal member Frank Madill resigned in early 2000. David Fry was elected as his replacement in February.
 Liberal member Ray Groom resigned on 9 August 2001. Michael Hodgman was elected as his replacement on 21 August.
 Liberal member Peter Hodgman resigned in 2001. Martin McManus was elected as his replacement on 19 October.
 Labor member Fran Bladel resigned in 2002. Neville Oliver was elected as her replacement on 22 April.

Distribution of seats

Members of Tasmanian parliaments by term
21st-century Australian politicians
20th-century Australian politicians